William Russell van Horn (July 30, 1885 – March 11, 1970) was an American lightweight boxer who competed in the early twentieth century. He was born in Pennsylvania and died in Wickenburg, Arizona.

In 1904 van Horn won a bronze medal in lightweight class. In November 1905 the AAU disqualified the second placed Jack Egan from all AAU competitions and he had to return all his prizes. Therefore, van Horn moved up to silver.

References

External links
 Russell van Horn's profile at Sports Reference.com
 Russell van Horn at FindAGrave

1885 births
1970 deaths
Boxers from Pennsylvania
Lightweight boxers
Olympic boxers of the United States
Boxers at the 1904 Summer Olympics
Olympic silver medalists for the United States in boxing
Place of birth missing
People from Wickenburg, Arizona
American male boxers
Medalists at the 1904 Summer Olympics